Hamza Abu-Ghalia (born 10 December 1980) is a Libyan weightlifter. He competed in the 2004 Summer Olympics.

References

1980 births
Living people
Weightlifters at the 2004 Summer Olympics
Libyan male weightlifters
Olympic weightlifters of Libya